The Route Is Calculated is a 2016 Russian horror thriller film directed by Oleg Asadulin.

Plot 
A man killed his own wife, dismembered the corpse and hid the body of a woman in the trunk of a car. A few months later, a man named Andrey buys a cheap, but high-quality car and with his family goes to another city. During the trip, his wife Olga hears unusual sounds and informs Andrey about it and this causes conflict between them, because Andrei does not hear anything like that. And their daughter at this time is talking to an invisible woman who does not like family conflicts and gets power over family, the route of which has already been calculated.

Cast 
  as Andrey
 Svetlana Ustinova as Olga
 Vitaliya Kornienko as Ksyusha
 Kristina Shapovalova as saleswoman at a gas station
 Sergey Safronov as Pop
 Ilya Safronov as Pop
 Andrey Safronov as Pop
 Diana Melison as Lena
 Aleksandr Tsyoma as hunter

References

External links 
 

2016 films
2010s Russian-language films
2016 horror thriller films
Russian horror thriller films
Horror films based on actual events
Thriller films based on actual events